The year 1941 in film involved some significant events, in particular the release of a film consistently rated as one of the greatest of all time, Citizen Kane.

Top-grossing films (U.S.)
The top ten 1941 released films by box office gross in North America are as follows:

Events
January 17 – Gone with the Wind goes into general release in the United States after touring in a roadshow version during 1940. Becoming a cultural phenomenon, it sells an estimated 60 million tickets this year alone. Adjusted for inflation with numerous rereleases, it remains the highest grossing domestic film of all time with $1.8 billion.
March 24 – Glenn Miller begins work on his 1st movie Sun Valley Serenade for Twentieth Century Fox.
May 1 – Orson Welles' Citizen Kane, consistently rated as one of the films considered the all-time best, is premiered at the Palace Theatre (New York City).
July 2 – Sergeant York, the film biopic of World War I hero Alvin C. York, starring Gary Cooper in the title role, premieres in New York City. It is the highest-grossing picture of the year and earns Cooper the first of two Academy Awards for Best Actor.
September – Senate Investigation into Motion Picture War Propaganda in the United States.
October 3 – The Maltese Falcon, considered one of the greatest films noir, is released.

Academy Awards

Best Picture: How Green Was My Valley – 20th Century-Fox
Best Actor: Gary Cooper – Sergeant York
Best Actress: Joan Fontaine – Suspicion
Best Supporting Actor: Donald Crisp – How Green Was My Valley
Best Supporting Actress: Mary Astor – The Great Lie
Best Director: John Ford – How Green Was My Valley

1941 film releases
United States unless stated

January–March
January 1941
1 January
Princess Iron Fan (China)
16 January
The Face Behind the Mask
21 January
High Sierra
23 January
Suvorov 
24 January
Life with Henry
The Saint in Palm Springs
28 January
Sullivan's Travels
31 January
Buck Privates
Mr. & Mrs. Smith
February 1941
7 February
Back Street
18 February
Adam Had Four Sons
20 February
Tobacco Road
21 February
Andy Hardy's Private Secretary
Nice Girl?
The Strawberry Blonde
Western Union
25 February
The Lady Eve
March 1941
1 March
Brothers and Sisters of the Toda Family (Japan)
7 March
Rage in Heaven
8 March
Footsteps in the Dark
10 March
Flying Wild
21 March
The Sea Wolf
26 March
I Wanted Wings
28 March
Man Made Monster

April–June
April 1941
4 April
The Devil and Miss Jones
Ohm Krüger (Germany)
6 April
The Flame of New Orleans
10 April
Piccolo mondo antico (Italy)
11 April
Road to Zanzibar
That Night in Rio
12 April
The Great Lie
19 April
The Farmer's Wife (Britain)
Hatter's Castle (Britain)
Quiet Wedding (GB)
24 April
Crook's Tour (Britain)
Penny Serenade
25 April
They Met in Argentina
Ziegfeld Girl
30 April
That Hamilton Woman (GB)
May 1941
1 May
Citizen Kane
2 May
The Black Cat
3 May
Meet John Doe
5 May
Inspector Hornleigh Goes To It (GB)
7 May
Sheriff of Tombstone
9 May
U-Boat Course West! (Germany)
10 May
Spellbound
22 May
Blood and Sand
23 May
A Woman's Face
24 May
Crook's Tour
30 May
In the Navy
June 1941
7 June
Shining Victory
11 June
The Gang's All Here
13 June
Broadway Limited
Man Hunt
One Night in Lisbon
18 June
Moon Over Miami
20 June
The Big Store
The Reluctant Dragon
25 June
Caught in the Draft
26 June
Blossoms in the Dust
27 June
Hit the Road
28 June
Kipps
Love on the Dole (GB)

July–September
July 1941
2 July
Sergeant York
The Sea Wolf
4 July
A Charming Man (Czechoslovakia)
12 July
The Bride Came C.O.D.
18 July
The Shepherd of the Hills
25 July
Target for Tonight (GB)
26 July
Bad Men of Missouri
Pimpernel Smith
August 1941
1 August
Bowery Blitzkrieg
Charley's Aunt
2 August
Major Barbara (GB)
6 August
Hold That Ghost
7 August
Here Comes Mr. Jordan
8 August
Six Gun Gold
9 August
Manpower
12 August
Dr. Jekyll and Mr. Hyde
15 August
Life Begins for Andy Hardy
21 August
Sun Valley Serenade
28 August
The Blue Star Hotel (Czechoslovakia)
29 August
The Little Foxes
September
1 September
Lady Be Good
5 September
Charlie Chan in Rio
6 September
Cottage to Let (GB)
18 September
Ladies in Retirement
19 September
The Tyrant Father (Portugal)
25 September
A Yank in the RAF
You'll Never Get Rich
26 September
Hold Back the Dawn
It Started with Eve

October–December
October 1941
2 October
Honky Tonk
One Foot in Heaven
8 October
49th Parallel
Week-End in Havana
10 October
Never Give a Sucker an Even Break
17 October
The Devil and Daniel Webster
Jesse James at Bay
18 October
The Maltese Falcon
22 October
You Belong to Me
23 October
Dumbo
24 October
Spooks Run Wild
25 October
The Tell-Tale Heart
28 October
How Green Was My Valley
31 October
The Chocolate Soldier
November 1941
7 November
Unexpected Uncle
14 November
I Wake Up Screaming
Suspicion
15 November
Blues in the Night
21 November
Look Who's Laughing
Shadow of the Thin Man
Skylark
They Died with Their Boots On
27 November
Stormy Waters (France)
28 November
The Corsican Brothers
Keep 'Em Flying
December 1941
1 December
The 47 Ronin (Part 1) (Japan)
Tarzan's Secret Treasure
2 December
Ball of Fire
5 December
Mr. Bug Goes to Town
12 December
Among the Living
Red River Valley
The Wolf Man
18 December
H.M. Pulham, Esq.
Kathleen
21 December
The Heavenly Play (Sweden)
25 December
Louisiana Purchase
The Shanghai Gesture
26 December
Hellzapoppin'
The Sausage-Maker Who Disappeared (Norway)

Notable films released in 1941
United States unless stated

#
The 47 Ronin (Genroku chushingura), directed by Kenji Mizoguchi – (Japan)
49th Parallel, directed by Michael Powell, starring Leslie Howard and Laurence Olivier – (GB)

A
Adam Had Four Sons, starring Ingrid Bergman and Warner Baxter
Among the Living, starring Albert Dekker and Susan Hayward
Andy Hardy's Private Secretary, starring Mickey Rooney

B
Babes on Broadway, directed by Busby Berkeley, starring Judy Garland and Mickey Rooney
Back Street, starring Charles Boyer and Margaret Sullavan
Bad Men of Missouri, starring Dennis Morgan and Jane Wyman
Ball of Fire, directed by Howard Hawks, starring Gary Cooper and Barbara Stanwyck
The Big Store, starring the Marx Brothers, Margaret Dumont, Tony Martin
The Black Cat, starring Basil Rathbone and Bela Lugosi
Blood and Sand, starring Tyrone Power, Linda Darnell, Rita Hayworth
Blossoms in the Dust, starring Greer Garson and Walter Pidgeon
The Blue Star Hotel (Hotel Modrá hvězda), directed by Martin Frič – (Czechoslovakia)
Blues in the Night, starring Priscilla Lane and Betty Field
Bowery Blitzkrieg, starring the East Side Kids
The Bride Came C.O.D., starring James Cagney and Bette Davis
Broadway Limited, starring Victor McLaglen, Dennis O'Keefe, Patsy Kelly
Brothers and Sisters of the Toda Family, directed by Yasujirō Ozu – (Japan)
Buck Privates, starring Abbott and Costello

C
Caught in the Draft, starring Bob Hope and Dorothy Lamour
Charlie Chan in Rio, starring Sidney Toler
Charley's Aunt, starring Jack Benny
A Charming Man (Roztomilý člověk), directed by Martin Frič – (Czechoslovakia)
The Chocolate Soldier, starring Nelson Eddy
Churchill's Island (La Forteresse de Churchill) – (Canada)
Citizen Kane, directed by and starring Orson Welles, with Joseph Cotten, Agnes Moorehead, Everett Sloane, Dorothy Comingore, Ray Collins
The Corsican Brothers, starring Douglas Fairbanks, Jr.
Cottage to Let, directed by Anthony Asquith, starring Leslie Banks, Alastair Sim, John Mills – (GB)
Crook's Tour, starring Basil Radford and Naunton Wayne
Cuando los hijos se van (When Children Leave Home) – (Mexico)

D
The Devil and Daniel Webster (aka All That Money Can Buy), starring Walter Huston and Edward Arnold
The Devil and Miss Jones, starring Jean Arthur and Robert Cummings
Dr. Jekyll and Mr. Hyde, starring Spencer Tracy and Ingrid Bergman
Dumbo, animated film from Walt Disney

F
The Face Behind the Mask, starring Peter Lorre
The Farmer's Wife, starring Basil Sydney
Footsteps in the Dark, starring Errol Flynn
The Flame of New Orleans, starring Marlene Dietrich
Flying Wild, starring the East Side Kids
Freedom Radio, directed by Anthony Asquith – (GB)

G
The Gang's All Here, starring Frankie Darro and Mantan Moreland
The Ghost of St. Michael's, starring Will Hay and Charles Hawtrey – (GB)
The Great Lie, starring Mary Astor and Bette Davis

H
H.M. Pulham, Esq., starring Hedy Lamarr and Robert Young
The Hard Life of an Adventurer (Těžký život dobrodruha) – (Czechoslovakia)
Hatter's Castle, starring Robert Newton and Deborah Kerr – (Britain)
The Heavenly Play (Himlaspelet), directed by Alf Sjöberg – (Sweden)
Hellzapoppin', starring Ole Olsen and Chic Johnson
Here Comes Mr. Jordan, starring Robert Montgomery
High Sierra, starring Ida Lupino and Humphrey Bogart in his first starring role
Hit the Road, starring the Dead End Kids
Hold Back the Dawn, starring Charles Boyer, Olivia de Havilland and Paulette Goddard
Hold That Ghost, starring Abbott and Costello
Honky Tonk, starring Clark Gable and Lana Turner
How Green Was My Valley, directed by John Ford, starring Walter Pidgeon and Maureen O'Hara – winner of 5 Academy Awards

I
I Wake Up Screaming, starring Betty Grable, Victor Mature, Carole Landis
I Wanted Wings, starring Ray Milland, William Holden, Veronica Lake, Brian Donlevy
In the Navy, starring Bud Abbott and Lou Costello
Inspector Hornleigh Goes To It, starring Gordon Harker and Alastair Sim – (GB)
International Lady, starring George Brent and Basil Rathbone
The Iron Crown (La corona di ferro) – (Italy)
It Started with Eve, starring Deanna Durbin and Robert Cummings

J
Jesse James at Bay, starring Roy Rogers

K
Kathleen, starring Shirley Temple
Keep 'Em Flying, starring Bud Abbott and Lou Costello
Khazanchi (Cashier) – (India)
Kipps (British), based on the H.G. Wells novel, directed by Carol Reed, starring Michael Redgrave – (GB)

L
Ladies in Retirement, starring Ida Lupino and Louis Hayward
Lady Be Good, starring Eleanor Powell and Robert Young
The Lady Eve, directed by Preston Sturges, starring Barbara Stanwyck and Henry Fonda
Life Begins for Andy Hardy starring Lewis Stone, Mickey Rooney, Cecilia Parker, Fay Holden
Life with Henry, starring Jackie Cooper.
The Little Foxes, directed by William Wyler, starring Bette Davis
Look Who's Laughing, starring Edgar Bergen, Fibber McGee and Molly
Louisiana Purchase, starring Bob Hope
Love on the Dole, starring Deborah Kerr – (GB)

M
Major Barbara, directed by Gabriel Pascal, starring Wendy Hiller and Rex Harrison – (GB)
The Maltese Falcon, directed by John Huston, starring Humphrey Bogart, Mary Astor, Peter Lorre
Man Hunt, starring Walter Pidgeon and Joan Bennett
Man Made Monster, starring Lon Chaney Jr. and Lionel Atwill
Manpower, starring Edward G. Robinson, Marlene Dietrich, George Raft
Meet John Doe, starring Gary Cooper and Barbara Stanwyck
Moon Over Miami, starring Betty Grable
Mr. & Mrs. Smith, directed by Alfred Hitchcock, starring Carole Lombard and Robert Montgomery
Mr. Bug Goes to Town

N
Never Give a Sucker an Even Break, starring W. C. Fields
Nice Girl?, starring Deanna Durbin

O
Ohm Krüger (Uncle Kruger), starring Emil Jannings – (Germany)
One Foot in Heaven, starring Fredric March and Martha Scott
One Night in Lisbon, starring Fred MacMurray and Madeleine Carroll
One Night in Transylvania (Egy éjszaka Erdélyben) – (Hungary)

P
Penn of Pennsylvania, starring Clifford Evans and Deborah Kerr – (GB)
Penny Serenade, starring Irene Dunne and Cary Grant
Piccolo mondo antico (Old-Fashioned World), starring Alida Valli – (Italy)
Pimpernel Smith, directed by and starring Leslie Howard – (GB)
A Place to Live
Pride of the Bowery, starring the East Side Kids
Princess Iron Fan (Tie shan gong zhu) – (China)

Q
Quiet Wedding, directed by Anthony Asquith, starring Margaret Lockwood – (GB)

R
Rage in Heaven, starring Robert Montgomery and Ingrid Bergman
Red River Valley, directed by Joseph Kane, starring Roy Rogers
The Reluctant Dragon, starring Robert Benchley
Road to Zanzibar, starring Bob Hope and Bing Crosby

S
The Saint in Palm Springs, starring George Sanders
The Sausage-Maker Who Disappeared (Den forsvundne pølsemaker) – (Norway)
The Sea Wolf, starring Edward G. Robinson, Ida Lupino, John Garfield
Sergeant York, directed by Howard Hawks, starring Gary Cooper and Walter Brennan
Shadow of the Thin Man, starring William Powell and Myrna Loy
The Shanghai Gesture, starring Gene Tierney
The Shepherd of the Hills, starring John Wayne
Sheriff of Tombstone, starring Roy Rogers
Shining Victory, starring James Stephenson and Geraldine Fitzgerald
Sikandar (Alexander the Great) – (India) 
Six Gun Gold, starring Tim Holt
Skylark, starring Claudette Colbert and Ray Milland
Spellbound, starring Derek Farr – (GB)
Spooks Run Wild, starring East Side Kids and Bela Lugosi
Stormy Waters (Remorques), starring Jean Gabin and Michèle Morgan – (France)
The Strawberry Blonde, starring James Cagney, Olivia de Havilland, Rita Hayworth
Sullivan's Travels, directed by Preston Sturges, starring Joel McCrea and Veronica Lake
Sun Valley Serenade, starring Sonja Henie
Suspicion, directed by Alfred Hitchcock, starring Joan Fontaine and Cary Grant
Suvorov – (U.S.S.R.)
Swamp Water, directed by Jean Renoir, starring Walter Brennan and Walter Huston

T
The Tale of the Fox (Le Roman de Renard) – (France)
Target for Tonight, a propaganda documentary – (GB)
Tarzan's Secret Treasure, starring Johnny Weissmuller
Teresa Venerdì, directed by and starring Vittorio De Sica – (Italy)
That Hamilton Woman (aka Lady Hamilton), starring Vivien Leigh and Laurence Olivier – (GB)
That Night in Rio, starring Don Ameche, Alice Faye, Carmen Miranda
The Tell-Tale Heart, starring Joseph Schildkraut 
They Died with Their Boots On, starring Errol Flynn and Olivia de Havilland
They Met in Argentina, starring Maureen O'Hara and James Ellison 
Tobacco Road, starring Gene Tierney
Tosca, directed by Jean Renoir, starring Imperio Argentina and Michel Simon (Italy)
Turned Out Nice Again, starring George Formby – (GB)
The Tyrant Father (O Pai Tirano) – (Portugal)

U
U-Boat Course West! (U-Boote westwärts) – (Germany)
Unexpected Uncle, starring Anne Shirley, James Craig, Charles Coburn
Unholy Partners, starring Edward G. Robinson and Laraine Day

W
Week-End in Havana, starring Alice Faye, John Payne, Carmen Miranda and Cesar Romero
Western Union, starring Randolph Scott
When Ladies Meet, starring Joan Crawford, Greer Garson, Robert Taylor and Herbert Marshall
The Wolf Man, starring Lon Chaney, Jr.
A Woman's Face, starring Joan Crawford and Melvyn Douglas

Y
A Yank in the RAF, starring Tyrone Power and Betty Grable
You Belong to Me, starring Barbara Stanwyck and Henry Fonda
You'll Never Get Rich, starring Fred Astaire and Rita Hayworth

Z
Ziegfeld Girl, starring Judy Garland and James Stewart

Serials
The Adventures of Captain Marvel, starring Tom Tyler, directed by William Witney and John English
Dick Tracy vs Crime Inc, starring Ralph Byrd, directed by William Witney and John English
The Green Hornet, starring Gordon Jones
Holt of the Secret Service, directed by James W. Horne
The Iron Claw, directed by James W. Horne
Jungle Girl, starring Frances Gifford, directed by William Witney and John English
King of the Texas Rangers, directed by William Witney and John English
Riders of Death Valley, directed by Ray Taylor and Ford Beebe
Sea Raiders, directed by Ray Taylor and Ford Beebe
Sky Raiders, directed by Ray Taylor and Ford Beebe
The Spider Returns, starring Warren Hull, directed by James W. Horne
White Eagle, directed by James W. Horne

Comedy film series
Buster Keaton (1917–1944)
Laurel and Hardy (1921-1945)
Our Gang (1922–1944)
Marx Brothers (1929–1946)
The Three Stooges (1933–1962)

Animated short film series
Mickey Mouse (1928–1942, 1947–1953)
Looney Tunes (1930–1969)
Bugs Bunny (1941–1964)
Daffy Duck (1938–1968)
Porky Pig (1936–1946, 1948–1951)
Sniffles (1939–1946)
Inki (1939–1950)
Terrytoons (1930–1964)
Merrie Melodies (1931–1969)
Scrappy (1931-1941)
Popeye (1933–1957)
Color Rhapsodies (1934–1949)
Donald Duck (1937–1956)
Walter Lantz Cartunes (also known as New Universal Cartoons or Cartune Comedies) (1938–1942)
Goofy (1939–1955)
Andy Panda (1939–1949)
Tom and Jerry (1940–1958, 1961–1967)
 The Midnight Snack
 The Night Before Christmas
Woody Woodpecker (1941–1949,1951–1972)
Swing Symphonies (1941–1945)
The Fox and the Crow (1941–1950)
Superman (1941–1943)

Births
January 1
Simón Andreu, Spanish actor
Eva Ras, Serbian actress, writer and painter
January 3 - Derrick O'Connor, Irish actor (died 2018)
January 4 - John Bennett Perry, American actor
January 7 - Harvey Evans, American actor (died 2021)
January 10 – José Greci, Italian actress (died 2017)
January 12 - Long John Baldry, English-Canadian singer, musician and voice actor (died 2005)
January 14 – Faye Dunaway, American actress
January 15 - Geoffrey Beevers, British actor
January 19 - Putter Smith, American jazz bassist and actor
January 24 - Neil Diamond, American actor and singer
January 27 - Jeannie Epper, American stuntwoman and actress
January 31 – Jessica Walter, American actress (died 2021)
February 8 – Nick Nolte, American actor and producer
February 10 – Michael Apted, English director, producer and screenwriter (died 2021)
February 11 - Sonny Landham, American actor and stunt performer (died 2017)
February 13 - Bo Svenson, Swedish-American actor, director, screenwriter and producer
February 27 - Charlotte Stewart, American actress
March 3 - Rada Rassimov, Italian actress
March 4
John Aprea, American actor and comedian
Adrian Lyne, English director and producer
March 6 - George P. Wilbur, American actor and professional stuntman (died 2023)
March 14 – Wolfgang Petersen, German director, producer and screenwriter (died 2022)
March 16 – Bernardo Bertolucci, Italian director (died 2018)
March 18 - Frank McRae, American actor (died 2021)
March 20 - Paul Junger Witt, American producer (died 2018)
March 24 - David Fox, Canadian actor (died 2021)
April 3 - Eric Braeden, German actor
April 7
Cornelia Frances, English-Australian actress (died 2018)
Danny Wells, Canadian actor and comedian (died 2013)
April 20 – Ryan O'Neal, American actor
April 26 - Claudine Auger, French actress (died 2019)
April 28 – Ann-Margret, Swedish-born American actress, dancer and singer
May 2 - Paul Darrow, English actor (died 2019)
May 13 – Senta Berger, Austrian actress and producer
May 17 - Grace Zabriskie, American actress
May 18 - Miriam Margolyes, British-Australian character actress
May 19 - Tania Mallet, English actress and model (died 2019)
May 24 – Andrés García, Dominican-Mexican actor 
May 29
Nick McLean, American cinematographer and actor
Bill Weston, British stunt performer and actor (died 2012)
June 2
Stacy Keach, American actor
Mahmoud Yassine, Egyptian actor (died 2020)
June 5 – Spalding Gray, American actor and screenwriter (died 2004)
June 10 – Jürgen Prochnow, German actor
June 20
Stephen Frears, English film director
Dieter Mann, German actor (died 2022)
June 21
Joe Flaherty, Canadian-American actor and comedian
Lyman Ward, Canadian actor
June 22 – Michael Lerner, American actor
June 25 – Denys Arcand, Canadian director and screenwriter
June 27 – Krzysztof Kieślowski, Polish director (died 1996)
July 1 - Milos Milos, Serbian-born American actor and stunt double (died 1966)
July 10 - Robert Pine, American actor
July 17 - Paula Shaw, American actress
July 21 - Edward Herrmann, American actor, director and writer (died 2014)
July 26 - Darlene Love, American actress and singer
July 28 – Peter Cullen, Canadian voice actor
July 29 – David Warner, English actor (died 2022)
August 4
Martin Jarvis (actor), English actor
Paul Mooney, American comedian, writer and actor (died 2021)
August 7 - Franco Columbu, Italian bodybuilder, actor and producer (died 2019)
August 8 - Earl Boen, American actor (died 2023)
August 12 - Dana Ivey, American actress
August 15 - Lou Perryman, American character actor (died 2009)
August 26 - Joan Freeman (actress), American retired actress
August 28 - Tony Barry, Australian actor (died 2022)
September 18 - Gerry Bamman, American actor
September 26 – Martine Beswick, English actress and model
October 6 – Billy Murray, English actor
October 10 – Peter Coyote, American actor
October 19 – Simon Ward, English actor (died 2012)
October 20 – Clare Peploe, English-Italian screenwriter and director (died 2021)
October 23 – Mel Winkler, American actor (died 2020)
October 24 – Frank Aendenboom, Belgian actor (died 2018)
October 25 – Gordon Tootoosis, Aboriginal Canadian actor (died 2011)
October 31
Mischa Hausserman, Austrian-born American actor (died 2021)
Sally Kirkland, American actress
November 1 – Robert Foxworth, American actor
November 18 – David Hemmings, English actor, director and producer (died 2003)
November 22 – Tom Conti, Scottish actor
November 23 – Franco Nero, Italian actor
November 25 – Tiit Lilleorg, Estonian actor (died 2021)
November 27 - Tom Morga, American stuntman, stunt coordinator and actor
December 4 – Leila Säälik, Estonian actress
December 6
Evald Hermaküla, Estonian actor and director (died 2000)
Leon Russom, American actor
December 8 – Valora Noland, American actress (died 2022)
December 9 – Beau Bridges, American  actor
December 15 - Vladan Živković, Serbian actor (died 2022)
December 25 - John Capodice, American character actor

Deaths
January 4 – Henri Bergson, 81, French writer
January 10 – Joe Penner, 36, American comedian, actor, The Boys from Syracuse, Millionaire Playboy, The Day the Bookies Wept, Mr. Doodle Kicks Off
March 13 – Stuart Walker, 63, American director, White Woman, Great Expectations
April 23 – Stanley Fields, 57, American actor, The Great Plane Robbery, The Lady from Cheyenne
May 8 – Tore Svennberg, 83, Swedish actor, The Phantom Carriage, A Woman's Face
May 12 – Ruth Stonehouse, 48, American actress, film director, The Satin Woman
May 22 – Ida Waterman, 89, American actress, Stella Maris, The Enchanted Cottage, Amarilly of Clothes-Line Alley, Esmerelda
June 28 – Richard Carle, 69, American actor, The Little Red Schoolhouse, Love Before Breakfast, Rhythm in the Clouds, She Asked for It
July 25 - Purnell Pratt, 55, American actor, Alibi, Scarface, The Mystery Squadron, Dancing Feet
August 13 – J. Stuart Blackton, 66, British-American film producer and director, co-founder of Vitagraph Studios, The Glorious Adventure
September 18 – Claude King, 66, English actor, Behind the Mask, It Couldn't Have Happened – But It Did
October 9 – Helen Morgan, 41, American actress and singer, You Belong to Me, Applause, Show Boat
October 26 – Victor Schertzinger, 53, American director, Paramount on Parade, Road to Zanzibar
November 2 – Bengt Djurberg, 43, Swedish actor, Troll-elgen
December 21 – David Howard, 45, American film director, Daniel Boone

Film Debuts 
Yvonne De Carlo – Harvard, Here I Come
Cyd Charisse – The Gay Parisian
Eva Gabor – Forced Landing
Ava Gardner – Fancy Answers
Jackie Gleason – Navy Blues
Sterling Hayden – Virginia
Charlton Heston – Peer Gynt
Deborah Kerr – Major Barbara
Bruce Lee – Golden Gate Girl
Norman Lloyd – The Forgotten Man
Agnes Moorehead – Citizen Kane
Margaret O'Brien – Babes on Broadway
Donna Reed – The Get-Away
Frank Sinatra – Las Vegas Nights
Marie Windsor – Unexpected Uncle
Teresa Wright – The Little Foxes

References 

 
Film by year